This is a list of schools in Hisar (previously spelled Hissar), in Hisar district in the state of Haryana in northwestern India.

Schools

The following is an incomplete list of schools in Hisar, India.

 Leading Angel Public School, Hisar (LAPS), Amardeep Colony, Kaimiri Rd, est. 1997
 Aryan Public School, Agroha
 Arya High School, Kalirawan Hisar est. 1996 
 Modern Defence School, Hisar
 Indus Public School, Hisar, Sector 16–17 run by the Indus Group of Institutions
 Army Public School, Hisar est. 1990
 Campus School CCS HAU, Hisar est. 1971
 CAV High School est. 1918
 Chhaju Ram Jat Senior Secondary School, Hisar 
 Chhaju Ram Public School, Hisar
 Government High School, Hisar
 Government Girls High School, Hisar* Govt. School, Kanwari
 Govt. Girls School, Kanwari
 I. D. D. A. V. public school, sector 14
 Kendriya Vidyalaya, Military Station, Hisar est. 1984
 K. L. Arya DAV Public School
 St. Kabir's School, Dabra Road, est. 1984
 St. Sophia Senior Secondary School
 Thakur Dass Bhargava Senior Secondary Model School est. 1963
 Ved Senior Secondary School, Hisar, gali no 4, Jawahar Nagar
 Vidya Devi Jindal School est. 1984
 New Yashoda Public School, UE-II, Hisar est. 1986
 Sharda public high school, Dabra chowk, near railway Fatak, Hisar est.1987
 O.P.JINDAL MODERN SCHOOL, INDUSTRIAL AREA, HISAR
 The Aryan School, Hisar
 St. Francis Xavier School est. 1991

See also

 Haryana Board of School Education
 State Counselling Board, Haryana
 List of institutions of higher education in Haryana
 List of universities and colleges in Hisar
 Rajiv Gandhi Education City
 Kurukshetra University
 List of colleges affiliated to Kurukshetra University, Kurukshetra
 List of agricultural universities in India
 List of deemed universities
 List of universities in India
 Department of Elementary Education, Haryana
 Director Secondary Education, Haryana
 Department of Higher Education, Haryana
 Department of School Education, Haryana

References

Haryana, Hisar
Hisar
 Schools
Hisar Schools